David Kittredge (born April 4, 1972) is an American film director, editor and screenwriter. He earned his Bachelor of Arts from New York University's Tisch School of the Arts and is the owner and creative director of Triple Fire Productions, a Los Angeles-based production company.

He is a producer on all four episodes of the 2022 Shudder original series Queer for Fear, which was executive produced by Bryan Fuller. Kittredge is the editor of the first two episodes and has additional editing credits on the latter two episodes.

In 2020, he became the producer and host of the podcast The Outcast Presented by Outfest, a podcast about LGBT content creators and their allies. Guests on the first season included Justin Simien, John Cameron Mitchell, Jonathan Groff, Michael Mayer, Christian Borle, Darryl Stephens, Christine Vachon, Jeffrey Schwarz, H.P. Mendoza, Jamie Babbit, Jim Fall, Miss Coco Peru, Laverne Cox and Shangela.

He was the editor of the new director's cut of 54, which took over six months to create and utilized over 40 minutes of footage not found in the film's theatrical release. The film premiered to acclaim at the 65th Berlin International Film Festival in February 2015.

His first feature as writer/director, Pornography: A Thriller, debuted at NewFest in June 2009 and was released on DVD by Wolfe Video July 13, 2010.

Filmography 
 54 (feature film) Editor, Director's Cut, 2015
 Pornography: A Thriller (feature film) Writer, director, co-editor, 2009
 Target Audience (short film) Writer, director, 2002
 Fairy Tale (short film) Writer, director, editor, composer, 1998

References

External links
David Kittredge official site
Triple Fire Productions

Pornography: A Thriller official site

American film directors
American film editors
American male screenwriters
LGBT film directors
American LGBT screenwriters
1972 births
Living people
Tisch School of the Arts alumni